Iberospondylus is an extinct genus of basal temnospondyl amphibian which lived in a marine environment.  The type material was found in the Emma Quarry Amphibian Bed of the Puertollano Basin, Ciudad Real province, southern Spain and extended the record for temnospondyls on the peninsula by 45 million years.  Along with the holotype, a skull with several disarticulated vertebrae and ribs, two other partial skeletons are known.  The name is derived from "Iberia" name of the peninsula where Spain is located, plus "spodylos", Greek for vertebra. The species name is in honor of Dr. Hans-Peter Schultze.

External links

Publication.
 &  2001. "The oldest stegocephalian from the Iberian Peninsula: evidence that temnospondyls were euryhaline" Comptes Rendus de l’Académie des Sciences - Series III - Sciences de la Vie 324(5):495-501

Carboniferous temnospondyls of Europe
Prehistoric amphibian genera
Fossils of Spain
Fossil taxa described in 2001